The 1874 South Carolina gubernatorial election was held on November 3, 1874 to select the governor and lieutenant governor of the state of South Carolina. Daniel Henry Chamberlain won the election and became the 76th governor of South Carolina.

Campaign

At the convention of the state Republicans on September 8 through September 11 in Columbia, the delegates felt that reform was vital for the continuation of Republican power. Governor Franklin J. Moses, Jr. was caught up in corruption scandals and never considered as a nominee for reelection to Governor. Instead, Daniel Henry Chamberlain was nominated for Governor and soundly won the nomination.

Chamberlain had been the Attorney General of South Carolina from 1868 to 1872 and pushed for reform of the state government. His association with Radical Republicans such as Senator John J. Patterson and former Governor Robert Kingston Scott enabled him to keep the support of stalwart Republicans while preaching a reform message.

It was this close association with Radical Republicans that again caused a split within the Republican party. The Independent Republicans met in Charleston on October 2 to select candidates for Governor and Lieutenant Governor. John T. Green was chosen to be their nominee for Governor and Martin Delany, a black man, was their candidate for lieutenant governor. The Independent Republicans adopted the Republican platform and the only difference between the two parties was that the Independent Republicans claimed their intention to clean up state government if elected.

The Conservative Party of South Carolina formed in 1874 from the members of the State Tax Union advocating for change. They endorsed the Independent Republican ticket for statewide offices and their platform consisted entirely of restoring honesty and efficiency in state government.

General election
The general election was held on November 3, 1874 and Daniel Henry Chamberlain was elected as governor of South Carolina. Turnout was the highest for a gubernatorial election thus held in South Carolina, although many white voters stayed away from the polls.

 
|-
| bgcolor="#ff00ff" |
| Independent Republican
| John T. Green
| align="right" | 68,818
| align="right" | 46.1
| align="right" | +11.8
|-

|-
| 
| colspan=5 |Republican hold
|-

See also
Governor of South Carolina
List of governors of South Carolina
South Carolina gubernatorial elections

References
"Election Returns." Reports and Resolutions of the General Assembly of the State of South Carolina at the Regular Session, 1873-'74. Columbia, South Carolina: Republican Printing Company, 1874, p. 85.

External links
SCIway Biography of Governor Daniel Henry Chamberlain

1874 United States gubernatorial elections
1874
Gubernatorial
November 1874 events